Le Soleil is a daily newspaper published in Dakar, Senegal and founded in 1970.

History
In 1933, French press publisher Charles de Breteuil founded the Paris-Dakar as a weekly newspaper. The Paris-Dakar would in 1936 become the first daily newspaper in subsaharan Africa. Following the independence of Senegal, the paper changed its name in 1961 and became the Dakar-Matin. On 20 May 1970, it finally became Le Soleil.

See also
 Media of Senegal

External links
Official website 

Newspapers published in Senegal
French West Africa
Publications established in 1970